Baadre (also written Ba'adra, Badra or Bathra, is a town located in the Shekhan District of the Ninawa Governorate in northern Iraq. The town is located in the Nineveh Plains. It belongs to the disputed territories of Northern Iraq. According to 2014 statistics, Baadre's urban population was 9 835 and the rural population was 5 167.

Baadre's residents are mostly Yazidis and is considered the political capital of the Yazidis as it has been the base of the group's leader, the Mir. The castle of the princely family is found here, as well as the mausoleum of the highly revered Mîr Alî Beg (Reign: 1899-1913).

History
The village was originally an Assyrian village known as Bet Edrai.

In Ba'athist Iraq, the population of Baadre was deported because of their support for Peshmerga.

According to Shamal Adeeb, who was the town's mayor at the time, the town and the 10 villages in the vicinity took in 2,028 displaced families totaling 12,115 people fleeing the Sinjar massacre in 2014

References 

Populated places in Nineveh Governorate
Yazidi populated places in Iraq
Nineveh Plains
Historic Assyrian communities in Iraq